Hofbauer is a German surname. Notable people with the surname include:

Clement Maria Hofbauer (Saint Clement, 1751–1820), patron saint of Vienna
Ernst Hofbauer (1925–1984), Austrian film director
Gert Hofbauer (born 1937), Austrian conductor and trumpeter
Jil Y. Creek, also known as Ilona Hofbauer, contemporary Austrian guitar virtuoso
Kevin Hofbauer, Australian actor

See also
Hofbauer cell, type of cell found in the human female placenta
Hofbauer Österreich, Viennese chocolatier founded in 1882, now owned by Lindt & Sprüngli
Hofbauer Treppen, staircase maker in Abensberg, Germany, operating since 1706

German-language surnames